Choptank is an unincorporated town and census-designated place on the Eastern Shore of Maryland, in Caroline County, Maryland, United States. As of the 2010 census it had a population of 129.

The town was founded in the 17th century. It is located on the tidal Choptank River, which flows into Chesapeake Bay. Tradition has it that the name "choptank" was a crude Anglicisation of the Algonquian name for the river, probably in the Nanticoke language. There was also a group of Algonquians called the Choptank tribe.

The town is located at the southwestern corner of Caroline County on the northeast bank of the Choptank River, just north of where Hunting Creek enters the river from the east. Choptank Road leads northeast  to the town of Preston and the nearest state highways, Maryland Routes 16 and 331.

Demographics

References

Census-designated places in Caroline County, Maryland
Census-designated places in Maryland
Maryland populated places on the Chesapeake Bay